Romé António Hebo (born 11 April 1992) is an Angolan professional handball player for Dinamo București and the Angolan national team.

References

1992 births
Living people
Angolan male handball players
CS Dinamo București (men's handball) players
S.L. Benfica handball players
African Games silver medalists for Angola
African Games medalists in handball
Competitors at the 2011 All-Africa Games
Competitors at the 2015 African Games
Expatriate handball players
Angolan expatriate sportspeople in Romania
Angolan expatriate sportspeople in Portugal